Abel of Tacla Haimonot was a monk at the monastery of Tacla Haimonot. He is considered a saint of the Coptic Orthodox Church, and has a feast day of July 13.

References
Holweck, F. G. A Biographical Dictionary of the Saints. St. Louis, MO: B. Herder Book Co., 1924.

Year of birth missing
Year of death missing
Oriental Orthodox monks
Coptic Orthodox saints
Christian saints in unknown century